Jayu Quta (Aymara for "salt lake") may refer to:

 Jayu Quta (Carangas), a lake in the  Carangas Province and Sud Carangas Province, Oruro Department, Bolivia
 Jayu Quta (Ladislao Cabrera), a lake in the  Salinas de Garci Mendoza Municipality, Ladislao Cabrera Province, Oruro Department, Bolivia